Van Brunt Creek is a tributary of Roaring Brook in Lackawanna County, Pennsylvania, in the United States. The creek has one named tributary, which is known as Langan Creek. At least two bridges have been constructed across Van Brunt Creek.

Course
Van Brunt Creek begins in Mullen Swamp in Roaring Brook Township. It flows southeast for several tenths of a mile before turning south and entering Moscow. After a few tenths of a mile, the creek turns southeast for several tenths of a mile, crossing Pennsylvania Route 690, before turning east. After several tenths of a mile it receives Langan Creek, its only named tributary, from the right. It then crosses Pennsylvania Route 435 and turns north-northeast for a few tenths of a mile before reaching its confluence with Roaring Brook.

Tributaries
Van Brunt Creek has one named tributary, which is known as Langan Creek, which joins Van Brunt Creek in Moscow. It also has a number of unnamed tributaries.

Hydrology
Upstream of Langan Creek, the peak annual discharge of Van Brunt Creek has a 10 percent chance of reaching 428 cubic feet per second. It has a 2 percent chance of reaching 731 cubic feet per second and a 1 percent chance of reaching 884 cubic feet per second. The peak annual discharge has a 0.2 percent chance of reaching 1307 cubic feet per second.

It has a 2 percent chance of reaching 647 cubic feet per second and a 1 percent chance of reaching 784 cubic feet per second. The peak annual discharge has a 0.2 percent chance of reaching 1160 cubic feet per second.

The North Pocono Public Library in Moscow once applied for a permit to discharge stormwater into Van Brunt Creek for construction purposes.

Geography and geology

A soil known as the Wellsboro extremely stony loam occurs in the vicinity of Van Brunt Creek. The surficial geology in the creek's vicinity mainly consists of a glacial or resedimented till known as Wisconsinan Till. However, alluvium is present along the creek in its middle and upper reaches and there are some patches of Wisconsinan Ice-Contact Drift in the watershed, as well as a few patches of bedrock consisting of conglomeratic sandstone, sandstone, and shale. There are also wetlands in the creek's headwaters and two patches of fill near the creek.

Watershed and biology
Van Brunt Creek is entirely within the United States Geological Survey quadrangle of Moscow. The creek is a High-Quality Coldwater Fishery and a Migratory Fishery.

Van Brunt Creek is one of the main sources of flooding in Moscow, as its tributary Langan Creek.

History
Van Brunt Creek was entered into the Geographic Names Information System on August 2, 1979. Its identifier in the Geographic Names Information System is 1200124.

A concrete arch bridge carrying Pennsylvania Route 435 was built over Van Brunt Creek in 1940. A steel stringer/multi-beam or girder bridge was built over the creek in Moscow in the same year. The latter bridge has been given a weight limit of 28 tons, or 38 tons for combination loads.

One case of typhoid was observed in the vicinity of Van Brunt Creek in the early 1910s.

See also
Kellum Creek, next tributary of Roaring Brook going downstream
Bear Brook (Roaring Brook), next tributary of Roaring Brook going upstream
List of rivers of Pennsylvania
List of tributaries of the Lackawanna River

References

External links
Google Street View image of Van Brunt Creek

Rivers of Lackawanna County, Pennsylvania
Tributaries of Roaring Brook (Lackawanna River)
Rivers of Pennsylvania